Dmitry Aleksandrovich Kovalyov (born 27 March 1976 in Kaluga, Russia) is a former Russian rower. He competed at the 1999 World Rowing Championships and 2000 Summer Olympics. He won the bronze medal for rowing.

References

1976 births
Living people
Sportspeople from Kaluga
Rowers at the 2000 Summer Olympics
Russian male rowers
Olympic rowers of Russia
Kaluga State University alumni